Terence Leslie Waller (born 9 March 1946) is a retired British boxer. He fought as Terry Waller.

Boxing career
He competed in the men's light welterweight event at the 1968 Summer Olympics. He also represented England in the welterweight division, at the 1970 British Commonwealth Games in Edinburgh, Scotland.

Waller won five Amateur Boxing Association British titles, the 1967 lightweight title, the 1970, 1973 and 1974 welterweight titles and 1972 light-welterweight title when boxing out of the Lynn ABC.

References

External links
 

1946 births
Living people
British male boxers
Olympic boxers of Great Britain
Boxers at the 1968 Summer Olympics
Boxers from Greater London
Boxers at the 1970 British Commonwealth Games
Light-welterweight boxers
Commonwealth Games competitors for England